George E. Burghard (1895–1963) was an American philatelist who was added to the Roll of Distinguished Philatelists in 1963.

References

Signatories to the Roll of Distinguished Philatelists
1895 births
1963 deaths
American philatelists